Nyssodectes is a genus of beetles in the family Cerambycidae, containing the following species:

 Nyssodectes bispecularis (White, 1855)
 Nyssodectes concinna (Bates, 1885)
 Nyssodectes dulcissimus (Bates, 1863)
 Nyssodectes longula (Bates, 1881)
 Nyssodectes roseicollis (Bates, 1872)
 Nyssodectes veracruzi Dillon, 1955

References

Acanthocinini